"Shape of You (Reshaped)" was the fourth and final single from Beverley Knight's album, Who I Am. It was a remix of the album track "Shape of You", featuring new vocals, lyrics and production by Wyclef Jean and was included on a re-release of the album in 2003. The remixed track was originally due for release in November 2002 but due to promotional reasons it was put back until early 2003. The single was a limited edition, containing a sticker, which by UK chart rules makes the single unable to qualify for the charts. The B-side "Whatever's Clever" has been release as a single in several south European countries, like Italy or Switzerland.

The video for the single was directed by Max & Dania.

Track list
 "Shape of You (Reshaped)" (featuring Hollywood)
 "Shape of You" (album version)
 "Whatever's Clever" (Fusion mix)
 "Shape of You (Reshaped)" (video) (featuring Hollywood and Wyclef Jean)

Personnel
Written by Beverley Knight, Wyclef Jean, Jerry Duplessis and J. Jean
Produced by Wyclef Jean and Jerry Duplessis
All vocals performed and arranged by Beverley Knight
Additional rap and spoken vocals provided by Hollywood and Wyclef Jean
Recorded at Platinum Sound Studios, NYC

See also
Beverley Knight discography

References

2003 singles
Beverley Knight songs
Songs written by Wyclef Jean
Songs written by Jerry Duplessis
Song recordings produced by Jerry Duplessis
Songs written by Beverley Knight
Song recordings produced by Wyclef Jean
Music videos directed by Max & Dania